William L. Sylvester (August 21, 1928 – March 30, 2022) was an American football player and coach and college athletics administrator. He served as the head football coach at Butler University in Indianapolis, Indiana from 1970 to 1984, compiling a record of 84–65–2. Sylvester was also the athletic director at Butler from 1975 to 1989.

Head coaching record

College

References

1928 births
2022 deaths
American football quarterbacks
Butler Bulldogs athletic directors
Butler Bulldogs football coaches
Butler Bulldogs football players
High school football coaches in Indiana
Players of American football from Indianapolis
Purdue Boilermakers football coaches